Van Buren is an unincorporated community in Livingston Parish, Louisiana, United States.

History
In 1832 the village of Van Buren was designated as the parish seat for all of Livingston Parish. The village served as the administrative center for the parish until 1872 when the seat was moved to Springfield, Louisiana. The name of the community is derived from Martin Van Buren who was serving as the Vice President under Andrew Jackson when the community was founded. Martin Van Buren later became the 8th President of the United States.

References

Unincorporated communities in Livingston Parish, Louisiana
Unincorporated communities in Louisiana